Cwm Penmachno (historically called Tre-Gynwal) is a village at the head of Cwm Machno in North Wales.

History 
The village was built in the 1860s as a quarry settlement. The Penmachno quarry lay immediately south and above the settlement. Higher up the valley was the Rhiwbach slate quarry, which was formerly linked by the Rhiwbach Tramway to the Ffestiniog Railway at Blaenau Ffestiniog. Streams flow from the steep-sided valley, forming the source of the River Machno, which flows through the larger village of Penmachno before joining the River Conwy south of Betws-y-Coed.

Facilities 
The village attracts tourists, particularly mountain bikers, kayakers, canoeists and walkers. The Penmachno Mountain Bike Trail starts at the car park located between Cwm Penmachno and Penmachno.

There is a community centre and Heritage Room in the village at the former Shiloh Chapel.

Situated near the end of the valley is The Latymer School's outdoor centre, Ysgol Latymer Outdoor Pursuits Centre (occupying the buildings of the former primary school). The school runs residential trips each year for year 7 and year 9 pupils, as well as various Geography and PE trips. The Latymer School purchased this centre in Snowdonia National Park so that its pupils could get to know each other better and to discover their individual skills.

References

External links

 Photographs of Cwm Penmachno Slate Quarry

Bro Machno
Villages in Conwy County Borough